Natalie Raitano (born October 3, 1966) is a retired American actress and current fitness professional, fitness expert, strength training coach.

Raitano was born in Charleroi, Pennsylvania and is of Italian descent. She is a 1984 graduate of Monongahela Valley Catholic High School, in Monongahela, Pennsylvania and also studied ballet. Natalie was active working with Special Olympics as her mother was also an active contributor in efforts to co-ordinate volunteers. She is best known for portraying the role of Nikki Franco on the syndicated action series V.I.P. In 1999 Natalie appeared on the MTV hit show Loveline along with co-stars (Pamela Anderson and Molly Culver) from the television series. They gave advice to the audience and answered calls.

Prior to V.I.P., Raitano was an aerobics instructor and was the host of the ESPN2 show Hip Hop Body Shop. She was also a member of a singing musical group called Breeze.

In 2006, she hosted a podcast, "Famous Shit Stories". In late 2006, she starred in Killing Down which was written and directed by Blake Calhoun. Natalie was also well known for her role as "Nate" in the hit NBC television series Pink.

Filmography

References

External links 
https://ins

1966 births
Living people
Actresses from Pennsylvania
American people of Italian descent
American television actresses
People from Charleroi, Pennsylvania
21st-century American women
tagram.com/natalieraitanofitness?igshid=YmMyMTA2M2Y=